The Downtown Riverfront Streetcar Project is a proposed  streetcar line intended to connect West Sacramento to Sacramento's downtown business districts and the greater transportation network. The project is being undertaken by a consortium including the City of Sacramento, the City of West Sacramento, the Yolo County Transportation District, and the Sacramento Regional Transit District.

Planning

In 2008 West Sacramento voters passed Measures U and V, a raise in sales tax dedicated to streetcar funding. At the time, the streetcar was envisioned as a  line running from Midtown to West Sacramento. While distinct from the RT Light Rail system, it would have shared some right-of-way and assets with that system; RT would likely also operate the line. If built, the service was expected to attract 5,800 daily riders.

The project received $50 million from the federal government for construction in May 2017. By June 2017, $200 million in local, state, and federal grants had been secured to build the streetcar line. A special district that includes businesses close to the streetcar agreed to a tax to offset operating costs; it was expected to generate $50 million over 25 years.

Plans stalled in 2019 as construction bids came in significantly higher than expected, with the lowest bid at $184 million, or $76 million higher than anticipated. The Sacramento City Council dissolved its special-use district dedicated to streetcar maintenance in August 2019. 

After failure of the initial plan, the line was retooled into a shorter  route running from Sacramento Valley Station to Sutter Health Park in West Sacramento via Tower Bridge with one additional stop.  the plan requires updating environmental documents, additional funding from host cities, and FTA approval.

See also
Streetcars in North America
Light rail in the United States

References

External links
Downtown / Riverfront Streetcar
City of Sacramento Streetcar Site
West Sacramento Streetcar Site

Proposed railway lines in California
Streetcars in California
Transportation in Sacramento, California
West Sacramento, California